The People's Movement for Democracy in Chad is a political party in Chad.

In the parliamentary election held on 21 April 2002, the party won five out of 155 seats. In the May 2006 presidential election, its candidate, Mahamat Abdoulaye, won 7.07% of the vote.

References

Political parties in Chad